NationsUniversity, also known as Nations University or NationsU, is a private Christian university in New Orleans, Louisiana. It only offers distance education (as well as in small learning pods and different locales)and focuses on "the development of faith and the training of Christian leaders around the world." While NationsUniversity's founding faculty and many of the staff are affiliated with the Churches of Christ, NationsUniversity itself is a nondenominational online Christian university, which offers certificates, bachelor's in religious studies, and a master's degree in theological studies, and a Master of Divinity (M.Div.) degree.

The school offers all of its programs through the internet and correspondence but does provide some degree of remote student services including having a full-time chaplain on staff.

The school has become a popular school for low-cost education for Church of Christ ministers in Kenya.

History
NationsU was incorporated in 1996 by Richard Ady, Mac Lynn, and Darrell Frazier. Ady and Lynn had been college classmates. Ady's career had been in church work and Lynn had worked in higher education as a teacher and administrator. Ady had previously founded the World English Institute.   Gathering volunteers who would travel around the globe, conducting courses and seminars in religious studies, was the plan.  As time progressed, around two hundred volunteers were enlisted to provide assistance.  As the group's activity strengthened, the demand for religious degree programs strengthened. Therefore, the organization became officially incorporated in Louisiana on July 19, 1996 as NationsUniversity.

The school celebrated its 25th anniversary in 2020 with an online event during the COVID19 pandemic.

Academics
NationsU offers three different degree programs and three certificate programs. These programs include:
 Certificate of Biblical Studies
 Certificate in Christian Ministry 
 Graduate Certificate in Biblical Studies·
 Bachelor of Religious Studies
 Master of Theological Studies
 Master of Divinity

In 2011 the student announced that it has served 5,000 student to date with its programs. As of December 1, 2019, active enrollment stood at 1482 students in 100 countries and 40 states within the U.S. Of the total enrollment, 328 were formally admitted into the Certificate in Biblical Studies, 228 to the Bachelor of Religious Studies, 80 to the Master of Theological Studies, and 47 to the Master of Divinity. The remainder were as yet not formally admitted to a specific program of study  and as of December 31, 2018, 1,369 degrees have been awarded since the founding in 1996.

Accreditation and Affliations
The institution is accredited by The Distance Education Accrediting Commission (DEAC). 

Since 2019, the institution has been a member of the Evangelical Council for Financial Accountability.

References

External links

Distance education institutions based in the United States
Educational institutions established in 1996
Universities and colleges affiliated with the Churches of Christ
1996 establishments in Louisiana
Universities and colleges in New Orleans
Private universities and colleges in Louisiana
Distance Education Accreditation Commission